Madayikonam  is a village in Irinjalakuda municipality of Thrissur district in the state of Kerala, India.

Demographics
 India census, Madayikonam had a population of 13427 with 6344 males and 7083 females.

References

Villages in Mukundapuram Taluk
Irinjalakuda